Yintai may refer to:

Yintai District, in Tongchuan, Shaanxi, China
Beijing Yintai Centre, building in Beijing, China
Beijing Yintai Centre Tower 2, 63-floor 250 meter (820 foot) tall skyscraper